Computerize may refer to: 

 Computerization: equipping something with or the usage of and associated automation by computers and software
 Business process reengineering that converts a manual process into one done by a computer
 Digital transformation of a service or business
 Equipping with a general purpose computer, embedded computer, or computer system
 Inputting data (computing) into computers
 Digitizing information for computers
 Creating computer-generated content

See also